is a district located in Wakayama Prefecture, Japan.

As of September 1, 2008, the district has an estimated population of 28,171 and a density of 84.6 persons/km2. The total area is 332.93 km2.

Towns and villages 
 Katsuragi
 Kōya
 Kudoyama

Timeline 
 On October 1, 2005 the village of Hanazono merged into the town of Katsuragi. (4 towns)
 On March 1, 2006 the town of Kōyaguchi merged with the old city of Hashimoto to form the new city of Hashimoto. (3 towns)

Districts in Wakayama Prefecture